Gordon Thomas was the fourth head football coach at Tuskegee University in Tuskegee, Alabama, and he held that position for two seasons, from 1913 until 1914.  His coaching record at Tuskegee was 4–2–4.

References

Year of birth missing
Year of death missing
Tuskegee Golden Tigers football coaches